Gérin-Lajoie is a French-Canadian surname.  Notable people with this name include:

Antoine Gérin-Lajoie (1824–1882), Canadian (Quebec) poet and novelist
Charles Gérin-Lajoie (1824–1895), Canadian (Quebec) businessman and political figure
Marie Lacoste Gérin-Lajoie (1867–1945), Canadian (Quebec) feminist
Paul Gérin-Lajoie (1920–2018), Canadian (Quebec) lawyer, philanthropist and politician

See also
Gérin
Gérin-Lajoie family
Lajoie (disambiguation)

French-language surnames
Compound surnames